The Alleluia Files is a science fantasy novel by American writer Sharon Shinn, published in 1998. It is the third book in the Samaria series, although it is the last to take place chronologically.

Plot summary
Generations ago, religious people built a colony spaceship called Jehovah. A planet called Samaria was established. The colony ship, orbiting above, was able to provide supplies and services. These were accessed by genetically modified 'angels', who were the only ones capable of performing the right vocal tones.

Over the generations, the concept of the ship was forgotten and it was believed Jehovah was an actual deity. Now factions of 'angels' fight against rebel forces called 'Jacobites'. The angels want to keep their power and the Jacobites wish to know the truth.

References

External links 
 Review at The SF Site.

1998 American novels
Novels by Sharon Shinn
Samaria series
American fantasy novels
1998 science fiction novels
Ace Books books